Jack, Jackie, Jake or Jaquelin Robertson may refer to:

 Jack Robertson (Scottish footballer) (born 1875)
 Jack Robertson (footballer, born 1889) (1889–1975), Australian rules footballer for Melbourne, 1909 to 1913
 Jack Robertson (footballer, born 1902) (1902–1972), Australian rules footballer for Melbourne, 1923 to 1924
 Jack Robertson (South African cricketer) (1906–1985), South African test cricketer
 Jack Robertson (footballer, born 1909) (1909–1939), former Australian rules footballer
 Jack Robertson (English cricketer) (1917–1996), English cricketer
 Jack Robertson (politician) (1928–1971), provincial politician from Alberta, Canada
 Jackie Robertson (1928–2014), Scottish professional footballer
 Jake Robertson (born 1989), New Zealand distance runner
Jaquelin T. Robertson (1933–2020), American architect

See also
 Robertson (surname)
 John Robertson (disambiguation)